Keratin, type I cuticular Ha1 is a protein that in humans is encoded by the KRT31 gene.

Function 

The protein encoded by this gene is a member of the keratin gene family. As a type I hair keratin, it is an acidic protein which heterodimerizes with type II keratins to form hair and nails. The type I hair keratins are clustered in a region of chromosome 17q12-q21 and have the same direction of transcription.

Model organisms 

Model organisms have been used in the study of KRT31 function. A conditional knockout mouse line called Krt31tm1e(KOMP)Wtsi was generated at the Wellcome Trust Sanger Institute. Male and female animals underwent a standardized phenotypic screen to determine the effects of deletion. Additional screens performed:  - In-depth immunological phenotyping

References

Further reading